Ashley River Historic District is a historic district located west of the Ashley in the South Carolina Lowcountry near Charleston, South Carolina, United States. The Historic District includes land from five municipalities, almost equally split between Charleston and Dorchester counties. The district includes dry land, swamps, and marshes of the Rantowles Creek and Stono Swamp watershed.

The historic district includes historic and archaeological resources associated with the rice culture and phosphate mining of the early-eighteenth century to the mid-nineteenth century, and the hunting plantations and timber industry preserves of the late nineteenth century through the mid-twentieth century. Historically, the Wando, Cooper, Ashley, Stono, and Edisto rivers served as the primary transportation routes in the Lowcountry. These waterways were used for exploration and settlement, the movement of goods, and the cultivation of staple crops.

It was listed on the National Register of Historic Places in 1994. Its boundaries were increased from 7,000 acres to 23,828.26 acres on October 22, 2010.

It includes some of the following separately listed sites as contributing properties:
 Ashley River
 Ashley River Road
 Fort Bull
 Atlantic Coast Line Railroad Trestle
 Drayton Hall, a National Historic Landmark;
 Magnolia Plantation and Gardens (Charleston, South Carolina);
 Runnymeade Schoolhouse
 Middleton Place, another National Historic Landmark
 Old Dorchester;
 The Laurels
 MacLaura Hall

Gallery

References

External links 
 

Historic districts on the National Register of Historic Places in South Carolina
Geography of Charleston County, South Carolina
Buildings and structures in North Charleston, South Carolina
National Register of Historic Places in Charleston County, South Carolina